Coup de tête is a 1994 French language album by Canadian singer Roch Voisine. It includes the hit singles "Laisse-la rêver" and "Jean Johnny Jean".

Track listing
"Coup de tête" 
"J'entends frapper" 
"Jean Johnny Jean" 
"Laisse-la rêver (She Had a Dream)"
"Ma lady mon secret" 
"Miss Caprice" 
"Seine et St-Laurent" 
"Le Vagabond" 
"Celui-là" 
"Dites-moi" 
"L'Homme du Nord" 
"Lettre au chanteur" 
"Ma mère chantait toujours"

External links
Roch Voisine Official site album page

1994 albums
Roch Voisine albums
French-language albums
Juno Award for Francophone Album of the Year albums